The Order of the Cross of Terra Mariana (also the Order of the Cross of St. Mary's Land) was instituted by the President of Estonia, Lennart Meri, on 16 May 1995 to honour the independence of the Estonian state. (The Latin name Terra Mariana, meaning the "Land of Mary", is a poetic synonym for Estonia, and designated the area which includes what is now Estonia in medieval times.)

The Order of the Cross of Terra Mariana is bestowed upon the President of the Republic. Presidents of the Republic who have ceased to hold office keep the Order of the Cross of Terra Mariana. The Collar of the Order was used de facto as the badge of office of the President of the Republic, since Soviet authorities took the original presidential collar, that of the Order of the National Coat of Arms, out of Estonia after the Soviet occupation of Estonia in 1940; it remains  in the Kremlin in Moscow. A new collar of that order was made in 2008.

The Order of the Cross of Terra Mariana is also given as a decoration of the highest class to foreigners who have rendered special services to the Republic of Estonia. As such it is the highest and most distinguished order granted by Estonia to non-Estonian citizens.

Classes

The Order of the Cross of Terra Mariana comprises six classes:
 One special class – The Collar of the Cross of Terra Mariana;
 Five basic classes – 1st, 2nd, 3rd, 4th and 5th class.

The crosses and shields of all the classes of the Order of the Cross of Terra Mariana have the same design and are of the same size.

The blue colour tone of the  moiré ribands belonging to the decorations of all the classes of the Order of the Cross of Terra Mariana is determined according to the international PANTONE colour-table as 300 C.

Notable recipients

Recipients of the Collar

The recipients are :

Estonian presidents 
 President Lennart Meri (1992–2001), 10.09.1995 (Serie 5 – n° ?)
 President Arnold Rüütel (2001–2006), 08.10.2001 (Serie 270 – n° 1138)
 President Toomas Hendrik Ilves (2006–2016), 09.10.2006 (Serie 692 – n° 1071)
 President Kersti Kaljulaid (2016-2021), 10.10.2016

Foreign heads of state

Recipients of the First Class 

The recipients are :

Former foreign heads of state and government 
These decorations are awarded for targeted reasons :

Consorts of foreign heads of state and royalties

Presidents of Parliament, prime ministers, foreign ministers, ambassadors and other high officials

High Personalities

Recipients of the Fourth Class 
 Robert Fripp, 2008

Recipients of the Fifth Class
 Lydia Vasikova, 2001

See also
 :Category:Recipients of the Order of the Cross of Terra Mariana

References

External links

 The Order of the Cross of Terra Mariana, president.ee
 List of recipients

Orders, decorations, and medals of Estonia
Cross of Terra Mariana, Order of the
Awards established in 1995
1995 establishments in Estonia